Centaurea caroli-henrici, the Karl-henrikh's centaury, is a species of flowering plant in the  Asteraceae family.

Distribution 
Its natural habitat is the Transcaucasus.

Taxonomy 
It was named by Manfred Dittrich, and Elenora Tzolakovna Gabrieljan, in Candollea, 48(1): 245. in 1993.

References 

caroli-henrici
Critically endangered plants
Critically endangered flora of Asia
Critically endangered biota of Europe